Zelkowitz is a surname. 
Helen Zelkowitz (1911–2006), American broadcaster
Marvin Zelkowitz, American computer scientist
17801 Zelkowitz, minor planet named for Rachel Lauren Zelkowitz
Goldie Zelkowitz, a 1974 album by Genya Ravan